In Greek mythology, Pherespondus (Ancient Greek: Φερεσπόνδῳ) was the satyr herald of Dionysus during the Indian War.

Family 
In secret union, Hermes fathered him, Lycus and Pronomus to Iphthime, daughter of Dorus.

Mythology 
Eiraphiotes (i.e. Dionysus) entrusted to the three satyr brothers the dignity of the staff of the heavenly herald which their father was the source of wisdom.

Pherespondus was ordered by Dionysus to be bear the message to Deriades to surrender or to fight the god."He summoned Pherespondos,' one swift like the wind, the offspring of the heavenly herald, the clever son of Iphthime, and greeted him with friendly words: Son of Hermaon, herald that I love, go take this message to proud Deriades: 'Prince, accept the gifts of Lyaios without war, or fight against Bromios and you shall be like Orontes!' So he spoke, and the herald on swift shoes holding his father's rod travelled from land to land, until he made his way to the Eastern country."

Notes

References 

 Nonnus of Panopolis, Dionysiaca translated by William Henry Denham Rouse (1863-1950), from the Loeb Classical Library, Cambridge, MA, Harvard University Press, 1940. Online version at the Topos Text Project.
 Nonnus of Panopolis, Dionysiaca. 3 Vols. W.H.D. Rouse. Cambridge, MA., Harvard University Press; London, William Heinemann, Ltd. 1940–1942. Greek text available at the Perseus Digital Library.

Characters in Greek mythology